The Kawasaki KZ305 CSR  was a small street cruiser motorcycle produced in the early eighties.

Specifications
 306cc displacement
 Chain drive or belt drive for '81-'82 (CSR model) or belt drive for '87-'88 (LTD model)
 6 speed transmission
 front disk, rear drum brakes
 point ignition
 Keihin CV32 carburetors

References

KZ305CSR
Belt drive motorcycles